Anthony Ricardo Young (born October 8, 1963) is a former professional American football safety in the National Football League. The 5'11" and 187 pound defensive back was a 3rd round selection (61st overall pick) by the Indianapolis Colts in the 1985 NFL Draft out of Temple University. He would play in 14 games for the Colts (starting 12) in 1985 recording 1 interception and 1 fumble recovery returned for a touchdown. In 1986, Young was the Colts selection for the Ed Block Courage Award. In 2005, Anthony Young was inducted in the Temple University Athletic Hall of Fame.

References

External links
profootballreference.com page

1963 births
Living people
Players of American football from Columbia, South Carolina
American football safeties
Temple Owls football players
Indianapolis Colts players
Ed Block Courage Award recipients